Dewi Iorwerth Ellis Bebb (7 August 1938 – 14 March 1996) was a Welsh rugby union player who won thirty-four caps for Wales as a wing.

Dewi Bebb was the son of the Welsh historian Ambrose Bebb. Educated at Friars School, Bangor, he later studied at Trinity College, Carmarthen, and Cardiff Teacher Training College. He made his debut for Swansea in a game against Llanelli in 1958. He remained with Swansea throughout his playing career, making 221 appearances, scoring 87 tries and captaining the team in the 1963–4 and 1964–5 seasons.

Career
He made his first appearance for Wales against England in 1959, eventually winning thirty four caps between 1959 and 1967 and scoring eleven tries. He was selected for Wales' first overseas tour in 1964 and played in the Welsh rugby team's  first match outside of Europe and its first in the Southern Hemisphere; played against East Africa in Nairobi on 12 May 1964, Wales winning 8–26.  He toured with the British and Irish Lions to South Africa in 1962, playing in two of the four tests, and to Australia, New Zealand and Canada in 1966, playing in all six tests. He was joint top try scorer on the 1966 tour.

Bebb was initially a teacher by profession, but later became a broadcaster and journalist.

His son Sion is a professional golfer who has played on the European Tour.

Notes

1938 births
1996 deaths
Barbarian F.C. players
Dewi
British & Irish Lions rugby union players from Wales
People associated with Trinity University College
People educated at Friars School, Bangor
Rugby union players from Bangor, Gwynedd
Rugby union wings
Swansea RFC players
Wales international rugby union players
Welsh rugby union players